Marc Jameson is an American software developer and former record producer, audio engineer, programmer, writer, and remixer. He began his career as an artist, in bands such as Kikiwest and The Distnce. Prior to his production work, he was the lead singer and keyboardist of the industrial rock band Diatribe. His credits include Christina Aguilera, Madonna, Kelly Osbourne, Matt & Kim, Static-X, Bon Jovi, and more.

Discography

Records
The Distnce - Dry Land
Christina Aguilera - Keeps Gettin' Better: A Decade of Hits
Static-X - Cult of Static
Boh Runga - "Names in the Sand"
Christina Aguilera - Back to Basics
Christina Aguilera - "Da Da Da", Pepsi
Sierra Swan - LadyLand
Kelly Osbourne - "Secret Lover"
Madonna - "American Life" (Felix Da Housecat's Devin Dazzle Club Mix)
Bon Jovi - Bounce
Lizzie West - Holy Road: Freedom Songs
Lizzie West - Lizzie West EP
Felix da Housecat - "Rocket Ride"
Shannon Curfman - Fast Lane Addiction
Mighty Six Ninety - Cheers To The Bitter End
Mighty Six Ninety - Cheers To The Bitter End [Bonus Tracks]

Film
Le Reve de la Mere - Original score
Secretary - "Chariots Rise", Lizzie West.
Strange Days - "Therapy".
Saving Emily - "Twilight", Jayspex.

Television
Miss Match - "Feel Better", Kikiwest.
MTV Road Rules - "Creeper", Kikiwest
Battle of the Sexes - "Creeper", Kikiwest.

Video games
Bloody Roar 2

Band origins

Kikiwest
Marc Jameson and Jacqueline Gallier formed Kikiwest in the late 1990s. A trip hop duo influenced by bands like Portishead, Kikiwest found initial success by sending out four demos to four different record companies and receiving offers from every one of them. Jameson and Gallier chose to sign with London/FFRR, and although the future looked bright for Kikiwest, the relationship fell apart before an album was released. Kikiwest has only had one official major release: "Creeper" on She - A Female Trip-Hop Experience (2001) compilation. They continue to release independent recording of their official MySpace website.

Kikiwest discography
 Kikiwest - She: A Female Triphop Experience
 Kikiwest - Chilled Sirens
 Kikiwest - Definitive Chilled

References

External links
The Distnce Official
MarcJameson.com
Official MySpace
Official Kikiwest MySpace

Record producers from California
Living people
Year of birth missing (living people)
Writers from Los Angeles